Afonso Miguel Castro Vilhena Taira (born 17 June 1992) is a Portuguese professional footballer who plays for Casa Pia A.C. as a defensive midfielder.

Club career
Born in Cascais, Lisbon, Taira joined Sporting CP's youth system in 2006 (aged 14) from neighbouring G.D. Estoril Praia. He made his professional debut in 2011 with Córdoba CF in the Spanish Segunda División, signing a three-year contract but making only three competitive appearances during his only season in Andalusia.

In 2012–13, Taira returned to his country after being loaned to Atlético Clube de Portugal of the Segunda Liga. The move was extended for the following campaign.

Taira returned to former youth club Estoril on 8 June 2014, after agreeing to a four-year deal. He played 13 Primeira Liga matches in his first year, in an eventual 12th-place finish.

Taira scored his first Portuguese top-flight goal on 24 October 2015, in a 2–2 home draw against Rio Ave FC. On 19 July 2017, he signed with Israeli Premier League team Hapoel Ironi Kiryat Shmona FC, and a year later Beitar Jerusalem F.C. in the same competition.

After spending the 2019–20 season in the Romanian Liga I with FC Hermannstadt, Taira joined Belenenses SAD on a two-year contract.

Personal life
Taira's father, José, was also a footballer and a midfielder. He appeared in more than 100 games in the Portuguese top tier, and also spent six years in Spain, representing mainly UD Salamanca.

References

External links

1992 births
Living people
Sportspeople from Cascais
Portuguese footballers
Association football midfielders
Segunda División players
Córdoba CF players
Primeira Liga players
Liga Portugal 2 players
Atlético Clube de Portugal players
G.D. Estoril Praia players
Belenenses SAD players
Casa Pia A.C. players
Israeli Premier League players
Hapoel Ironi Kiryat Shmona F.C. players
Beitar Jerusalem F.C. players
Liga I players
FC Hermannstadt players
Portugal youth international footballers
Portuguese expatriate footballers
Expatriate footballers in Spain
Expatriate footballers in Israel
Expatriate footballers in Romania
Portuguese expatriate sportspeople in Spain
Portuguese expatriate sportspeople in Israel
Portuguese expatriate sportspeople in Romania